Protais-Hamza Bumbu-Mutambala (born February 8, 1999) is a Canadian soccer player who plays for CS Mont-Royal Outremont.

Early life
Mutambala was born in a refugee camp in Nyarugusu, Tanzania, but grew up in Quebec City in Canada. He began playing youth soccer at age 10 with AS Sud-Ouest Montréal. Afterwards, he joined the Montreal Impact Academy, after being scouted playing in the Jeux de la rue.

Club career
In 2018, Mutambala played with Première Ligue de soccer du Québec side CS Longueuil.

In April 2019, Mutambala joined USL Championship side Ottawa Fury FC. After one seasons with the Fury, the club would cease operations for the 2020 season, making Mutambala a free agent.

In 2021, he played with FC Lanaudière in the Première Ligue de soccer du Québec.

In 2022, he joined another PLSQ side CS Mont-Royal Outremont, where he got to compete in the 2022 Canadian Championship.

International career
In 2015, he attended a youth camp with the Canadian U16 national team.

References

External links

1999 births
Living people
Canadian soccer players
Canada men's youth international soccer players
Association football midfielders
Soccer people from Quebec
Sportspeople from Quebec City
Canadian people of Democratic Republic of the Congo descent
Naturalized citizens of Canada
Ottawa Fury FC players
Première ligue de soccer du Québec players
USL Championship players
CS Longueuil players
CS Mont-Royal Outremont players
FC Lanaudière players